Salvatore "Toto" Cutugno (born 7 July 1943) is an Italian pop singer-songwriter and musician. He is best known for his worldwide hit song, "L'Italiano", released on his 1983 album of the same title. Cutugno also won the Eurovision Song Contest 1990 held in Zagreb, Croatia, SFR Yugoslavia with the song "Insieme: 1992", for which he wrote both lyrics and music.

Biography
Toto Cutugno was born in Fosdinovo, Lunigiana, (Tuscany), to a Sicilian father from Barcellona Pozzo di Gotto and a homemaker mother. Shortly after his birth the family moved to La Spezia (Liguria).

He began his musical career as a drummer, and later formed an Italo disco band together with Lino Losito and Mario Limongelli called Albatros. He also started a career as songwriter, contributing some of French-American singer Joe Dassin most well-known songs such as L'été indien, Et si tu n'existais pas and Le Jardin du Luxembourg (written with Vito Pallavicini). He also co-wrote Dalida's Monday Tuesday... Laissez moi danser ("Voglio l'anima"), which enjoyed Platinum record status shortly after its release.

In 1976, Albatros participated for the first time in the Sanremo Music Festival finishing in third place with the song Volo 504. Following another chart success with the song Santamaria De Portugal Albatros effectively dibanded, and Cutugno concentrated on his solo career. 

In 1980 Cutugno returned to the Sanremo Music Festival and won with the song Solo noi. However, Cutugno's affiliation with the festival is mostly remembered for L'italiano ("The Italian"), a song he presented in 1983. Originally intended for Adriano Celentano, who declined to sing it, L'italianos recapitulation of some of Italy's most popular social traits, made the song very popular with Italian expats. Although the song finished only fifth in Sanremo, it went on to become Cutugno's biggest international hit.

Cutugno would finish second in six more editions of Sanremo festival: in 1984 with the song Serenata ("Serenade"); in 1987 with Figli ("Sons" or "Children"); in 1988 with Emozioni ("Emotions"); in 1989 with the song Le mamme ("Mothers"); in 1990 with the song Gli amori ("Loves", but entitled "Good Love Gone Bad" in Ray Charles's version); and in 2005 with Annalisa Minetti with the song Come noi nessuno al mondo ("No One Else in the World Like Us"). Toto Cutugno participated to the festival a total of 13 times.

In 1990 Cutugno won the Eurovision Song Contest in Zagreb with his own composition, "Insieme: 1992" ("Together: 1992"), a ballad which celebrated European political integration and the establishment of the European Union. Along with Gigliola Cinquetti, Italy's second Eurovision winner, he presented the 1991 contest, which was staged in Rome as a result of his victory. Aged 46 years, 302 days, Cutugno became the oldest winner of the contest to date, surpassing the record set by André Claveau in 1958. Cutugno's record stood until 2000. He was also the last winner for Italy until Måneskin in 2021.

In March 2019 a group of politicians from the Ukrainian Parliament tried to stop Cutugno from performing in Kyiv, demanding through an open letter to the head of the country's security services, Vasyl Hrytsak, to ban the singer from entering Ukrainian territory, labelling him as "a Russian war supporter in Ukraine". Two days before, fellow Italian singer Al Bano was black listed on the Ukrainian website "Myrotvorets". Despite the controversy, the concert was eventually held in Kyiv on 23 March.

Personal life
Cutugno is married to Carla Cutugno.

Discography
 Come ieri, come oggi, come sempre (1978)
 Voglio l'anima (1979)
 Innamorata, innamorato, innamorati (1980)
 La mia musica (1982)
 L'italiano (1983)
 Per amore o per gioco (1985)
 Azzura malinconia (1986)
 Mediterraneo (1987)
 Toto Cutugno (1990)
 Insieme: 1992 (1990)
 Non è facile essere uomini (1992)
 Voglio andare a vivere in campagna (1995)
 Canzoni nascoste (1997)
 Il treno va (2002)
 Cantando (2004)
 Come noi nessuno al mondo (2005)
 Un falco chiuso in gabbia (2008)
 I Miei Sanremo (2010)
 Ritratto: 50 anni di musica (2015)

With Albatros
 Albatros (1976)

See also
 List of Eurovision Song Contest presenters
 List of Eurovision Song Contest winners

References

External links
Official website
Toto Cutugno Booking agent
  Toto Cutugno Spain Oficial (Idiomas: Español/Italiano/Inglés)
Toto Cutugo Fanclub Romania

"Insieme: 1992" lyrics with English translation
MSN Group

 
 

1943 births
Living people
People from the Province of Massa-Carrara
People from Tuscany
People of Sicilian descent
Italian pop singers
Italian male singers
Italian singer-songwriters
Eurovision Song Contest winners
Sanremo Music Festival winners
Eurovision Song Contest entrants for Italy
Eurovision Song Contest entrants of 1990